A number of Christian groups have called themselves the "True Church":

True Jesus Church
True Church of Jesus Christ of Latter Day Saints
True Church of Jesus Christ (Cutlerite)
True Orthodox Church
True Russian Orthodox Church

See also
One true church
Marks of the Church (Protestantism)